Oleg Aleksandrovich Alekseyev (born 21 December 1967) is a Russian politician. He has served as a deputy in the Saratov Oblast Duma twice, and is currently a member of the Federation Council from Saratov. Alekseyev served as a senator from the United Russia party from 28 September 2016 to 21 September 2017 and from 8 April 2020.

Early life 

In 1994 he graduated from the Saratov Institute of Agricultural Mechanization with a degree in mechanical engineering. After graduating from school in August 1985, he began work as a laborer. From November 1986 to November 1988, he served in the Soviet Army. After this, he worked part-time as a supplier at SSAU.

Politics 

In October 2012 Alekseyev was elected a deputy of the Saratov Oblast Duma of the fifth convocation. On 28 September 2016 he was elected to the Federation Council. He was a member of the Committee on Agrarian and Food Policy and Environmental Management, however he resigned in September 2017.

In September 2017, Alekseyev was again elected a deputy of the Saratov Oblast Duma. He worked as the first deputy director of the Federal State Budgetary Institution "Management of Saratovmeliovodkhoz". In April 2020, by the decision of the Saratov Oblast Duma, he was again elected to the Federation Council with a term expiring in September 2022. He is now a Member of the Committee on the Rules and Organization of Parliamentary Activities.

References 

1967 births
Living people
21st-century Russian politicians
People from Novouzensky District
Members of the Federation Council of Russia (after 2000)
Saratov State Agrarian University alumni